The Next Voice You Hear: The Best of Jackson Browne is a greatest hits album by the singer-songwriter Jackson Browne released in 1997.

History 
The compilation album includes songs from his early years as well as the later ones, plus two new songs: "The Rebel Jesus" and "The Next Voice You Hear"; however, it does not include any songs from Browne's 1989 album World in Motion. The Next Voice You Hear was superseded by 2004's more comprehensive compilation The Very Best of Jackson Browne.

The album was certified as a gold record in 2002 and platinum in 2004 by the RIAA.

The album was certified gold in Australia in 2003.

Reception

Referring to the 1997 Japanese release, Allmusic critic Stephen Thomas Erlewine noted the difficulty of picking tracks for the release and summarized: "there are still a number of equally good, if not better, cuts that are left off. As a result, The Next Voice You Hear is merely adequate for casual Browne fans, but it's nowhere near definitive."

Track listing
All songs by Jackson Browne unless otherwise noted.

Certifications

References

Jackson Browne albums
1997 greatest hits albums
Elektra Records compilation albums